Armon Williams (born August 13, 1973) is a former American football defensive back. He played for the Tennessee Oilers in 1997.

References

1973 births
Living people
American football defensive backs
Arizona Wildcats football players
Tennessee Oilers players
Barcelona Dragons players